The 1886–87 season was the fourth season Stoke took part the FA Cup.

Season review
Stoke's first FA Cup win finally arrived on 30 October 1886, when Welsh side Caernarfon Wanderers came to the Victoria Ground and were well beaten 10–1. But joy was short-lived as Crewe Alexandra again knocked Stoke out this time 6–4.

FA Cup

Squad statistics

References

Stoke City F.C. seasons
Stoke